Nancy Morejón (born 1944 in Havana) is a Cuban poet, critic, and essayist. She was a recipient of the Struga Poetry Evenings Golden Wreath Award. She is "the best known and most widely translated woman poet of post-revolutionary Cuba".

Biography
She was born and raised in a district of old Havana to working-class parents, Angélica Hernández Domínguez and Felipe Morejón Noyola. Her father is of African heritage and her mother of African extraction.

Nancy Morejón graduated with honours at the University of Havana, having studied Caribbean and French Literature, and she is fluent in French and English. She later taught French. She is a well-regarded translator of French and English into Spanish, particularly Caribbean writers, including Edouard Glissant, Jacques Roumain and Aimé Césaire, René Depestre.  Her own poetry has been translated into English, German, French, Portuguese, Galician, Russian, Macedonian, and other languages, and is included in the 1992 anthology Daughters of Africa, edited by Margaret Busby. Morejón as of 2013 is director of Revista Union, journal of Unión de Escritores y Artistas de Cuba (the Union of Writers and Artists; UNEAC); in 2008 she was elected president of the writer's section of UNEAC.

She has produced a number of journalistic, critical, and dramatic works. One of the most notable is her book-length treatments of poet Nicolás Guillén. In 1982 she was awarded the Cuban "Premio de la crítica" (Critic's Prize) for Piedra Pulida, and in 2001 won Cuba's National Prize for Literature, awarded for the first time to a black woman. This national prize for literature was created in 1983; Nicolás Guillén was the first to receive it. She also won the Golden Wreath of the Struga poetry evenings for 2006. She has toured extensively in the United States and in other countries; her work has been translated into more than ten languages, including English, Swedish and German.

She has lectured at universities throughout the country and has taught at Wellesley College and the University of Missouri, which, in 1995, conducted a two-day symposium on her work and published the papers in a special issue of the Afro-Hispanic Review. Howard University Press at Washington D.C. published in 1999 a collection of critical essays on her work: Singular Like A Bird: The Art of Nancy Morejon, compiled and prefaced by Miriam DeCosta-Willis, Ph.D. A collection of her poems entitled Richard trajo su flauta y otros argumentos (Richard brought his flute), edited by Mario Benedetti, Visor Books, was published in Madrid during the Spring of 2005.

Themes of work
Her work explores a range of themes: the mythology of the Cuban nation, the relation of the Black people of Cuba within that nation.  She often expresses an integrationist stance, in which Spanish and African cultures fuse to make a new, Cuban identity.  Much of her work—and the fact that she has been successful within the Cuban regime—locates her as a supporter of Cuban nationalism and the Cuban Revolution.  In addition, she also voices the situation of women within her society, expressing concern for women's experience  and for racial equality within  the Cuban revolution; often black women are  protagonists in her poems, most notably in the widely anthologized Mujer Negra (Black Woman).  Her work also treats the grievous fact of slavery as an ancestral experience.  Her work treats political themes as well as intimate, familial topics.  Critics have noted her playful observations about her own people, her effective use of particularly Cuban forms of humor, and her regular "indulgence" in highly lyrical, intimate, spiritual, or erotic poetry.

Selected bibliography
Amor, ciudad atribuída, poemas. Habana: Ediciones El Puente, 1964
Elogio de la danza. Mexico City: La Universidad Nacional Autónoma de México, 1982
Elogio y paisaje. Habana: Ediciones Unión, 1996
Fundación de la imagen. Habana: Editorial Letras Cubanas, 1988
Grenada Notebook/Cuaderno de Granada. Trans. Lisa Davis. New York: Círuculo de Cultura Cubana, 1984
Mutismos. Habana: Ediciones El Puente, 1962
Nación y mestizaje en Nicolás Guillén. Habana: Ediciones Unión, 1982
Octubre imprescindible. Habana: Ediciones Unión, 1982
Paisaje célebre. Caracas: Fundarte, Alcaldía de Caracas, 1993
Parajes de una época. Habana: Editorial Letras Caubanas, 1979
Piedra pulida. Habana: Editorial Letras Cubanas, 1986
Poemas. Mexico City: Universidad Autónoma de México, 1980
Poetas del mundo Latino en Tlaxcala. Tlaxcala: Universidad Autónoma de Tlaxcala, 1988
Recopilación de textos sobre Nicolás Guillén, ed. Habana Casa de las Américas, 1974
Richard trajo su flauta y otros argumentos. Habana: Unión de Escritores y Artistas de Cuba, 1967
Where the Island Sleeps Like a Wing. Trans. Kathleen Weaver. San Francisco: The Black Scholar Press, 1985
Mirar Adentro/Looking Within: Selected Poems, 1954-2000 (bilingual edition, African American Life Series). Ed. Juanamaria Cordones-Cook. Wayne State University Press, 2002, 
With Eyes and Soul: Images of Cuba. Trans. Pamela Carmell and David Frye. White Pine Press, 2004, 

Monographs
"A un muchacho," "Niña que lee en Estelí", "Soldado y yo." Toulouse: Caravelle, 1982
Baladas para un sueño. Habana: Unión de Escritores y Artistas de Cuba, 1989
Le Chaînon Poétique. (in French) Trans. Sandra Monet-Descombey. Champigny-sur-Marne, France: Edition L. C. J., 1994
Cuaderno de Granada. Habana: Casa de las Américas, 1984
Dos poemas de Nancy Morejón. Drawings and design by Rolando Estévez. Matanzas, Cuba: Ediciones Vigía, 1989
Lengua de pájaro. With Carmen Gonce. Habana: Instituto Cubano del Libro, 1971
Poemas de amor y de muerte. Toulouse: Caravelle, 1993
Ours the Earth. Trans. J. R. Pereira. Mona, Jamaica: Institute of Caribbean Studies, 1990
El río de Martín Pérez y otros poemas. Drawings and design by Rolando Estévez. Matanzas, Cuba: Ediciones Vigía, 1996

References

Last accessed February 7, 2005

External links 
 Nancy Morejón at poetenladen (poetshop)
 "From Havana: Nancy Morejon". Interview with Nancy Morejon, TeleSUR English, 7 December 2018. Via YouTube.  

1944 births
20th-century Cuban poets
20th-century Cuban women writers
21st-century Cuban poets
21st-century Cuban women writers
Cuban nationalists
Cuban women poets
Living people
Struga Poetry Evenings Golden Wreath laureates
University of Havana alumni
Cuban women essayists